The Cercopithecinae are a subfamily of the Old World monkeys, which comprises roughly 71 species, including the baboons, the macaques, and the vervet monkeys. Most cercopithecine monkeys are limited to sub-Saharan Africa, although the macaques range from the far eastern parts of Asia through northern Africa, as well as on Gibraltar.

Characteristics 
The various species are adapted to the different terrains they inhabit. Arboreal species are slim, delicate, and have a long tail, while terrestrial species are stockier and their tails can be small or completely nonexistent. All species have well-developed thumbs. Some species have ischial callosities on their rump, which can change their colour during their mating periods.

These monkeys are diurnal and live together in social groups. They live in all types of terrain and climate, from rain forests, savannah, and bald rocky areas, to cool or even snowy mountains, such as the Japanese macaque.

Most species are omnivorous, with diets ranging from fruits, leaves, seeds, buds, and mushrooms to insects, spiders, and smaller vertebrates. All species possess cheek pouches in which they can store food.

Gestation lasts around six to seven months. Young are weaned after three to 12 months and are fully mature within three to five years. The life expectancy of some species can be as long as 50 years.

Classification 
The Cercopithinae are often split into two tribes, Cercopithecini and Papionini, as shown in the list of genera below.

 Family Cercopithecidae 
 Subfamily Cercopithecinae
 Tribe Cercopithecini
 Genus Allenopithecus - Allen's swamp monkey
 Genus Miopithecus - talapoins
 Genus Erythrocebus - patas monkeys
 Genus Chlorocebus - vervet monkeys, etc.
 Genus Cercopithecus - guenons
 Tribe Papionini
 Genus Macaca - macaques
 Genus Lophocebus - crested mangabeys
 Genus Rungwecebus - highland mangabey
 Genus Papio - baboons
 Genus Theropithecus - gelada
 Genus Cercocebus - white-eyelid mangabeys
 Genus Mandrillus - drill and mandrill
 Subfamily Colobinae

See also
Parapapio

References

External links 
 

 
Mammal subfamilies
Old World monkeys
Taxa named by John Edward Gray
Taxa described in 1821